Poul Henningsens Plads station is an underground Copenhagen Metro station located close to Poul Henningsens Plads in the Østerbro district of Copenhagen, Denmark. The station is on the City Circle Line (M3), between Trianglen and Vibenshus Runddel, and is in Zone 1. It is situated at the corner of Tåsingegade and Reersøgade with a main entrance that faces Jagtvej.

History

The station was originally supposed to be located under Poul Henningsens Plads but was during the planning process relocated to an unnamed space at the corner of Tåsingegade and Reersøgade. The initial preparations with wire work and archeological excavations started in May 2011 and construction work of the station started in early 2013. The station is underground. It was opened on 29 September 2019 together with 16 other stations of the line.

Service

References

City Circle Line (Copenhagen Metro) stations
Railway stations opened in 2019
2019 establishments in Denmark
Railway stations in Denmark opened in the 21st century